The 1992/93 FIS Ski Jumping Europa Cup was the 13th and the last Europa Cup season in ski jumping for men and at the same counts as the 2nd Continental Cup winter season in ski jumping. Europa Cup was a predecessor of Continental Cup with events held only in Europe.

Other competitive circuits this season included the World Cup season.

Calendar

Men

Standings

Men

Europa Cup vs. Continental Cup 
This was originally last Europa Cup season and is also recognized as the first Continental Cup season by International Ski Federation although under this name began its first official season in 1993/94.

References

FIS Ski Jumping Continental Cup
FIS Ski Jumping Europa Cup
1992 in ski jumping
1993 in ski jumping